Satyrium myrtale, the Rebel's hairstreak, is a butterfly in the family Lycaenidae.

References 

Satyrium (butterfly)
Butterflies described in 1834
Taxa named by Johann Christoph Friedrich Klug